Sophie Marie of Hesse-Darmstadt (7 May 1661 – 22 August 1712) was a member of the House of Hesse and by marriage Duchess of Saxe-Eisenberg.

Life 
Sophie Marie was born in Darmstadt, a daughter of Count Louis VI of Hesse-Darmstadt (1630–1678) from his marriage to Maria Elisabeth of Holstein-Gottorp (1634–1665), a daughter of Duke Frederick III of Holstein-Gottorp.

On 9 February 1681 in Darmstadt, she married Duke Christian of Saxe-Eisenberg.  At the time, he was a widower and father of a daughter.  He had become the first Duke of Saxe-Eisenberg when Saxe-Gotha had been divided by Christian and his six brothers the year before. They had no children and Christian died without leaving an heir.  A dispute erupted among the remaining brothers and their descendants about he inheritance of Saxe-Eisenberg.

The Duchess was described as a very hard-working housewife, with a particular fondness for spinning. Disguised as an ordinary woman, she supplied local merchants with wool and yarn. She died in Gotha.

Notes

References 

 Johann Georg Theodor Grässe: The lore of the Kingdom of Saxony, Volume 2, Dresden 1874, p. 323-325.

|-

Sophie Marie
1661 births
1712 deaths
Daughters of monarchs